Bordoll is a brothel in Dortmund, Germany. The selection of prostitutes provided consist of entirely sex dolls rather than real people.

Etymology
The name Bordoll is a portmanteau of bordello and doll.

Dolls
Bordoll has 13 female dolls and one male. Each weighs 30kg, has a name, and is defined as either  "real", "fantasy", "skinny", or "anime". They are imported from Asia and cost the brothel doll £1,786 each.

Operation
Customers can have a session with a doll for about $100 per hour.

The dolls are cleaned and disinfected after every use.

References

Further reading 

 Images

External links
 Official website

Brothels in Germany